Hulst is a municipality and city in southwestern Netherlands in the east of Zeelandic Flanders.

History 

Hulst received city rights in the 12th century.

Hulst was captured from the Spanish in 1591 by Maurice of Orange but was recaptured by Archduke Albert in 1596. 

In 1640, the Dutch forces tried to conquer the city, but they were defeated in battle by the Spanish Army, and Frederick Henry was forced to retreat.
 
In 1645, the Siege of Hulst (to control the left bank of the Schelde river) occurred. It was led by Prince of Orange Frederick Henry, during the Eighty Years' War (1568–1648) with Spain.

A further siege took place in 1702, where General Menno van Coehoorn defended the town successfully for the Dutch and in 1747 when it was taken by the French after incompetent defence by Lt. General Pieter de la Rocque.

In the seventeenth century, a star fort was constructed.
The fortifications, constructed during that time, are historic examples of Dutch fortress architecture.

The name Hulst (Holly in English) would appear to come from the shape of the battlements. Holly is depicted growing around the towns crest.

Geography 

It is situated in the east of the region Zeelandic Flanders, which is connected by land only to Belgium, on the Dutch-Belgian border.

Hulst is neighbouring the municipalities of Terneuzen in the west, Stekene (Belgium) and Sint-Gillis-Waas (B) in the south, Beveren (B) in the east, and Reimerswaal in the north. The river Western Scheldt separates the land of Reimerswaal and Hulst.

The Drowned Land of Saeftinghe (Verdronken land van Saeftinghe) is a natural reserve in the north of the municipality. Its name refers to the Saeftinghe legend.

The population centers in the municipality are:

Government 
The mayor of Hulst is Jan-Frans Mulder of the Christian Democratic Appeal.

Culture 
Since June 2018, the city has its own letter artwork (a local variation on the capital's I Amsterdam). This work of art can be seen in turns at various locations in the municipality. The underlying idea is that the h at the beginning of a word is not pronounced in the Zeelandic / East Flemish dialect. Under this concept , a campaign for and branding of the city of Hulst was launched simultaneously.

Letter artwork for the city of Hulst

International relations 
Hulst is twinned with

Notable people 

 Johannes Crabbe (c. 1420–1 November 1488), abbot, Imperial counsellor and bibliophile.
 Cornelius Jansen (1510 in Hulst – 1576) was a Catholic exegete and the first Bishop of Ghent
 Gillis Mostaert (the Elder) (1528 in Hulst – 1598) a Flemish Renaissance painter and draughtsman
 Frans Mostaert (1528 in Hulst – 1560) a Flemish Renaissance painter specializing in landscape paintings
 Valentin de Lannoy a Flemish military commander and governor of Hulst in 1623
 Cornelis de Vos (1584 in Hulst – 1651) a Flemish painter, draughtsman and art dealer
 Paul de Vos (ca.1591/92 in Hulst – 1678) a Flemish Baroque painter of animals, hunting scenes and still lifes
 Pieter Nuyts (1598 in  Middelburg – 1655) a Dutch explorer, diplomat and politician
 Pieter Nuyts (1640 in  Middelburg – 1709) a Dutch poet and dramatist
 Theo Middelkamp (1914 in Nieuw-Namen – 2005) a Dutch cyclist, world champion in 1947

Gallery

References

External links

Official website (in Dutch)

 
Cities in the Netherlands
Municipalities of Zeeland
Populated places in Zeeland
Zeelandic Flanders